Marion Odicea "Odie" Spears (June 17, 1924 – March 28, 1985) was an American basketball player.

A 6'5" guard from Scottsville, Kentucky, Spears attended nearby Western Kentucky University but saw little playing time during his first two seasons. After his sophomore year, he left Western Kentucky to serve in the United States Army, where he played three seasons for the 326th Glider Infantry basketball team at Fort Bragg, North Carolina. He then returned to Western Kentucky in 1946 with improved skills and confidence and became the team's leading scorer during his junior and senior years. Spears received All-American honors in 1948 after leading Western Kentucky to a third-place finish in the National Invitation Tournament (then the nation's premier basketball tournament).

From 1948 to 1957, Spears played professionally in the National Basketball Association as a member of the Chicago Stags, Rochester Royals, Fort Wayne Pistons, and St. Louis Hawks.  He averaged 8.7 points per game and 4.0 rebounds per game in his NBA career and ranked as one of the league's top-ten free throw shooters three times.  Spears also played during the 1950–51 season for the Louisville Alumnites of the National Professional Basketball League.

After his playing career ended, Spears moved to Louisville, Kentucky, where he became an insurance executive. He was elected to the Western Kentucky Hall of Fame in 1993.

BAA/NBA career statistics

Regular season

Playoffs

Notes

External links
 

1924 births
1985 deaths
All-American college men's basketball players
Basketball players from Louisville, Kentucky
Chicago Stags draft picks
Chicago Stags players
Fort Wayne Pistons players
People from Scottsville, Kentucky
Rochester Royals players
St. Louis Hawks players
Western Kentucky Hilltoppers basketball players
American men's basketball players
Guards (basketball)
United States Army personnel of World War II